Bogdanowice  is a village located in Poland, in Opole Voivodeship, in Głubczyce County (Gmina Głubczyce).

Location

References

Villages in Głubczyce County